John Flanagan or Jack Flanagan may refer to:

Sportspeople
 Jack Flanagan (footballer) (1902–1989), English footballer
 John Flanagan (hammer thrower) (1868–1938), Irish-American three-time Olympic champion in athletics
 John Flanagan (Limerick hurler) (born 1956), Irish hurler
 John Flanagan (Scottish footballer) (1942–2013), played for St. Johnstone, Partick Thistle and Clyde
 John Flanagan (swimmer) (born 1975), Hawaiian swimmer/coach
 John Flanagan (Tipperary hurler) (born 1947), Irish hurler

Others
 John Flanagan (author) (born 1944), author of the Ranger's Apprentice series
 John Flanagan (sculptor) (1865–1952), designed the Washington U.S. quarter dollar coin
 John C. Flanagan (1906–1996), pioneer of aviation psychology
 John J. Flanagan (born 1961), New York State Senator
 John Mack Flanagan (1946–2018), American radio DJ
 John T. Flanagan (1906–1996), professor of literature
 Jack Flanagan (Australian politician) (John Flanagan, 1888–1949), Australian politician
 Jack Flanagan (New Hampshire politician) (born 1957)
 John Flanagan, British actor, in Thriller
 John C. Flanagan, judge who lived in the John C. Flanagan House in Peoria, Illinois

See also 
 Jon Flanagan (born 1993), English footballer
 John Flannagan (disambiguation)